Daniela Schadt (born 3 January 1960 in Hanau, West Germany) is a German journalist, and, since 2000, the domestic partner of Joachim Gauck, former President of Germany, who has been legally married since 1959 to Gerhild Radtke. She has sometimes been referred to by the media as "First Lady".

Early life and education
Daniela Schadt studied German, French, and politics at the University of Frankfurt.

Career
In 1985, Schadt became an editor at the Nürnberger Zeitung and was in charge of the German politics section. Upon the election of Gauck as President, she left the newspaper.

Other activities
 Jewish Museum Berlin, Member of the Board of Trustees
 UNICEF National Committee of Germany, Member

Honours

Foreign Honours
 : Dame Grand Cordon of the Order of Leopold
 : Member I Class of the Order of the Cross of Terra Mariana
 : Grand Cross of the National Order of Merit
 : Commander Grand Cross of the Order of the Three Stars (3 July 2013) 
 : Grand cross of the Order of Vytautas the Great
: Dame Grand Cross of the Royal Norwegian Order of Merit
 : Commander Grand Cross of the Order of the Polar Star

References

German journalists
1960 births
Living people
People from Hanau
Official social partners of national leaders
Spouses of presidents of Germany
Joachim Gauck
Recipients of the Order of the Cross of Terra Mariana, 1st Class